Local Independent Charities of America is a federated group of over 700 charities serving clients in a variety of fields, involving child welfare, homelessness, poverty, hunger, and animal welfare.  They screen and certify member organizations, and prepare them to participate in at-work employee charitable fund drives.

History
Originally started to prepare charities to participate in federal charitable fund drives, they have as of 2011 started working with fund drives at state and city levels.  Their website allows searching on charity types, and accepts online donations. Currently they provide listings in twelve states.

See also
 Combined Federal Campaign
 Chicago 2011 campaign

References

External links
Local Independent Charities of America website

Charities based in the United States